All Nighter is a 2017 American comedy film directed by Gavin Wiesen and written by Seth W. Owen. The film stars J. K. Simmons, Emile Hirsch, and Kristen Schaal. Principal photography began on July 6, 2015 on locations in Los Angeles, California.

The film was released in a limited release on March 17, 2017, before being released through video on demand on March 24, 2017, by Good Deed Entertainment.

Premise
When a globe-trotting, workaholic father (Simmons) trying to visit his daughter on a last minute layover in Los Angeles discovers that she's disappeared, he forces her awkward, nervous ex-boyfriend (Hirsch), still nursing a broken heart, to help him find her over the course of one increasingly crazy night.

Cast 

 J. K. Simmons as Mr. Gallo
 Emile Hirsch as Martin
 Jon Daly as Jimothy
 Taran Killam as Gary
 Xosha Roquemore as Megan
 Kristen Schaal as Roberta
 Analeigh Tipton as Ginnie
 Jon Bass as Trevor
 Shannon Woodward as Lois

Production 
On April 30, 2015, it was announced that Gavin Wiesen would next direct a buddy comedy The Runaround based on the script by Seth W. Owen, which would star J. K. Simmons as a workaholic father and Emile Hirsch as his daughter's ex-boyfriend. Producers of the film would be Mandy Tagger and Adi Ezroni through Spring Pictures, Ron Perlman and Josh Crook through Wing and a Prayer Pictures, along with P. Jennifer Dana. On July 24, 2015, Kristen Schaal joined the cast. On August 6, 2015, more cast members were announced, including Jon Daly, Taran Killam, Hunter Parrish, Analeigh Tipton, Bojesse Christopher, and Shannon Woodward.

Filming 
Principal photography on the film began on July 6, 2015 in Los Angeles.

Release
In November 2016, Good Deed Entertainment acquired U.S distribution rights to the film. The film was limited release on March 17, 2017, before being released through video on demand on March 24, 2017.

Reception
The film received negative reviews. On Rotten Tomatoes, the film has an approval rating of 14% based on 14 reviews, with an average rating of 4.20/10.

References

External links 
 

2017 films
American buddy comedy films
2010s buddy comedy films
Films set in Los Angeles
Films shot in Los Angeles
2017 comedy films
2010s English-language films
2010s American films